Akissi Delta also known as Loukou Akisse Delphine (born 1960) is an Ivorian actress and filmmaker.

Life
Born in Dimbokro on 5 March 1960, Akissi Delta never attended school. Starting as a dancer and model, she acted in Léonard Groguhet's Comment ça va and in several of Henri Duparc's films. In 2002 she created the television series Ma Famille.

Filmography

As actor
 Comment ça va [How are you], dir. Léonard Groguhet, 1987
 Bouka, dir. Roger Gnoan M'Bala, 1988
 Joli cœur [Sweet heart], dir. Henri Duparc, 1992
 Au nom du Christ [In the name of Christ], dir. Roger Gnoan M'Bala, 1993
 Rue Princesse, dir. Henri Duparc, 1993
 Afrique, mon Afrique [Africa, My Africa], dir. Idrissa Ouédraogo, 1994
 Bienvenue au Gondwana [Welcome to Gondwana], dir. Mamane, 2016

As director
 Les secrets d'Akissi
 Ma famille, 2002–07

References

External links
 

1960 births
Living people
Ivorian actresses
Ivorian television directors
Women television directors